Begonia heracleifolia, the star begonia, is a species of flowering plant in the family Begoniaceae. It is native to Mexico and northern Central America, and has been introduced to Cuba, Hispaniola, Puerto Rico, and Trinidad and Tobago. A widespread species that is adapted to drought, it possesses considerable genetic and morphological variation, particularly in leaf shape and patterning.

References

heracleifolia
Flora of Mexico
Flora of Guatemala
Flora of Belize
Flora of El Salvador
Flora of Honduras
Plants described in 1830